The Journal of Comparative Physiology A: Neuroethology, Sensory, Neural, and Behavioral Physiology is a monthly peer-reviewed scientific journal covering the intersection of ethology, neuroscience, and physiology. It was established in 1984, when it was split off from the Journal of Comparative Physiology. It was originally subtitled the Journal of Comparative Physiology A: Sensory, Neural, and Behavioral Physiology, obtaining its current name in 2001. The editor-in-chief is Friedrich G. Barth (University of Vienna). The journal become electronic only in 2017.

Abstracting and indexing
The journal is indexed and abstracted in the following bibliographic databases:

According to the Journal Citation Reports, the journal has a 2017 impact factor of 1.970.

References

External links

Ethology journals
Physiology journals
Neuroscience journals
Publications established in 1984
Monthly journals
English-language journals
Springer Science+Business Media academic journals